= Porn Star Zombies =

Porn Star Zombies is a horror comedy film developed from a script by Keith Emerson (not the keyboardist of ELP) which was a 2007 Slamdance Film Festival script competition semifinalist. Emerson secured a budget to produce and direct the film which was completed in 2010. As the film was being marketed for distribution, there was a brief theatrical run and coverage at the Cannes Film Festival in 2012. Porn Star Zombies has since been released on DVD by R-Squared Films.
